Dehaene is a surname. Notable people with the surname include:
Stanislas Dehaene, a professor at the Collège de France
Jean-Luc Dehaene, former Prime Minister of Belgium
, former mayor of Ypres
, Flemish politician, son of Jean-Luc Dehaene.